Robert Dauer (born 2 February 1953) is an Australian boxer. He competed in the men's welterweight event at the 1976 Summer Olympics.

References

1953 births
Living people
Australian male boxers
Olympic boxers of Australia
Boxers at the 1976 Summer Olympics
Place of birth missing (living people)
Welterweight boxers